Clube do Remo, commonly referred to as Remo, is a Brazilian professional club based in Belém, Pará founded on 5 February 1905. It competes in the Campeonato Brasileiro Série C, the third tier of Brazilian football, as well as in the Campeonato Paraense, the top flight of the Pará state football league.

History

Clube do Remo was founded on 5 February 1905, as Grupo do Remo. The founders, before founding Remo, had abandoned Sport Club do Pará. On 14 February 1908, Remo was closed, after the club's general assembly. On 29 March 1908, Remo's partners and Sport Club do Pará made a deal, and Remo was officially extinct in 1908. On 15 August 1911, Remo was reorganized following the initiative of Antonico Silva, Cândido Jucá, Carl Schumann, Elzaman Magalhães, Geraldo Motta, Jayme Lima, Norton Corllet, Oscar Saltão, Otto Bartels and Palmério Pinto.

In 1950, Remo held a tour to Venezuela at the invitation of the football federation of the country to compete in the Caracas International Tournament, which, according to some publications, may have been the precursor of the Little World Cup, played between the 1950s and 1960s. The team held five matches, getting four wins (La Salle, Unión, Military School and Deportivo Italia) and only one loss to Loyola, considering the higher strength of the Venezuelan football at the time. Remo is still seeking official recognition of the title by the CONMEBOL. If accepted, will be the first international title in club history.

Remo also has great campaigns on the national scene. His most outstanding campaigns were the 7th place in the Campeonato Brasileiro Série A in 1993 and the semifinals in the Copa do Brasil in 1991 – these results represent the best performance of a northern team in the history of both competitions.

In 2005, the club won the Campeonato Brasileiro Série C. This was the club's first national title. The club also has one title of the Copa Verde, three of the Torneio do Norte and one Torneio Norte-Nordeste, as well as being one of the largest state winners.

Symbols

Crest
The first Remo's emblem consisted of a navy blue rectangle, with the center a white anchor, in obliquely, circulated by thirteen stars of the same color. After the reorganization of 1911, the anchor gave way to a format shield similar to a buoy lifeguard, crossed by a pair of oars. At the top was the description "Grupo do Remo" and the environment, the initials "GR" intertwined.

In 1914, the college is renamed Clube do Remo. With this change, the shield also is renewed. The circular uniformity of the previous badge is maintained by adding the typical symmetrical side cut-outs of British heraldry - heritage of some founders of the club with academic training in Europe, especially in England. The acronym GR gives way to the CR.

Over the years, the shield has undergone some changes, without change your style. The last change occurred in 2013, seeking to rescue the origins of the club and to combine the concept of modernity. According to the Brand Manual, the Bluean shield now has a finish on the sidelines and superior to characterize volume and three-dimensionality, in addition to the reversal of the stars color according to the degree of importance of each title - five white representing the five state titles consecutive and golden, representing the national title of Campeonato Brasileiro Série C in 2005.

Anthem
The hymn of Clube do Remo came to an adjustment made by the poet Antônio Tavernard the carnival march created by Emílio Albim for block Cadetes Azulinos, created in 1933 and was formed by athletes, members, leaders and supporters who roamed the streets of Belém bound Republic Square. Tavernard exchanged 30 march of words to create the anthem of Azulinos Athletes, first published in the newspaper O Estado do Pará on 4 November 1941.

Colours
Raul Engelhard, one of the founders of the Grupo do Remo, on 5 February 1905, had been a student in England. Rowing Club supporter, also party race, has proposed that the official color of Remo was the same of Rowing: the United Kingdom's imperial blue. In 1911, the Grupo do Remo (regattas) turned Clube do Remo and, two years later, already disputed the first Campeonato Paraense, with horizontal stripes shirts in Navy Blue and white.

Traditional home kit

Since it emerged, the club features navy blue and white as its official colors. Thus, the main uniforms of all types adopt navy blue as the predominant color, reversing the order in secondary uniforms. The shirt used by the team in his first football match had horizontal stripes.

Kit suppliers

Supporters

In the 1970s, the prestigious magazine Revista Placar, elected the best supported clubs in each Brazilian state and the Leão Azul again confirmed its supremacy in Pará. In the 90s contributed further to the increase in Clube do Remo fans, due to the large made the club in this period: eight state titles, large national campaigns and supremacy in the Classic King of the Amazon (the taboo history of 33 games without losing for the biggest rival).

However, from the 2000s, the Clube do Remo began to get into a turbulent period in its history with successive failures in national competitions like the relegation for the Série C in 2005 and getting even without play a national championship three times.

Despite the difficulties, the fans, contrary to expectations, only increased. Proof of this was the IBOPE which ranked the Clube do Remo as the largest North of Brazil and the 16th in the ranking of the largest supporters of the country, besides being the northern fastest growing among fans in the range of 10 to 15 years, surpassing clubs like Botafogo, Fluminense and Coritiba. In Belém, Remo focuses its biggest fans. Currently, bluish appearance ranging from 1 million to 2 million.

Rivalries

Remo's biggest rival is Paysandu, with whom he plays the Clássico Rei da Amazônia (Amazon King derby) or Re-Pa, the largest in the northern region of Brazil. The first game took place on 14 June 1914, with Remo winning 2–1. The Periçá's Club has the most wins in the derby. Between 1993 and 1997, Remo applied a historical taboo on the rival. There were 33 matches (21 wins and 12 draws) in 4 years, 5 months and 24 days. In 2016, the derby was declared intangible cultural heritage of the Pará state, being qualified as a cultural expression of the people of Pará. To this day, more than 760 matches were played between both clubs; which makes this rivalry the football derby with most games played in history, beating even the oldest derbies from Europe.

Also, a further minor rivalry exists between Remo and Tuna Luso. The first match happened on 15 November 1931. It was a friendly that ended tied at 0–0.

Stadiums

Remo's stadium is Evandro Almeida (Baenão), which has a maximum capacity of 17,250 people. The stadium is named after Evandro Almeida, who was a Remo's football player and employee. The nickname Baenão is a reference to the place where the stadium is located, called Travessa Antônio Baena.

Mangueirão is used for the derbies against Paysandu and also for Remo big matches,  where the record attendance for Remo occurred on 5 November 2000, in a Copa João Havelange Group Yellow semifinal match attended by 55,000 fans against Paraná.

Players

Current squad

Out on loan

Youth players with first team numbers

Retired numbers

33 – Number dedicated to the Remo's supporters.

Honours
 Campeonato Brasileiro Série C
 Winners (1): 2005

 Copa Verde
 Winners (1): 2021

 Torneio Norte-Nordeste
 Winners (1): 1971

 Torneio do Norte
 Winners (3): 1968, 1969, 1971

 Campeonato Paraense
 Winners (47): 1913, 1914, 1915, 1916, 1917, 1918, 1919, 1924, 1925, 1926, 1930, 1933, 1936, 1940, 1949, 1950, 1952, 1953, 1954, 1960, 1964, 1968, 1973, 1974, 1975, 1977, 1978, 1979, 1986, 1989, 1990, 1991, 1993, 1994, 1995, 1996, 1997, 1999, 2003, 2004, 2007, 2008, 2014, 2015, 2018, 2019, 2022

References

External links
 Official site
 Remo 100%
 Remo on Globo Esporte

Clube do Remo
Association football clubs established in 1905
Football clubs in Pará
Football clubs in Brazil
Belém
1905 establishments in Brazil
Campeonato Brasileiro Série C winners
Copa Verde winners
Torneio Norte-Nordeste winners
Torneio do Norte winners